The Night Sessions is a 2008 novel by Scottish writer Ken MacLeod.  Set in the year 2037, the novel follows Edinburgh police officers investigating the murder of a priest in a world in which religious believers are a small and marginalized minority.  The novel won the British Science Fiction Award for Best Novel in 2008.

References

External links

Scottish science fiction novels
2008 science fiction novels
2008 British novels
Edinburgh in fiction
Fiction set in 2037
Religion in science fiction
Novels by Ken MacLeod
Orbit Books books